Vandalia is a city in and the county seat of Fayette County, Illinois, United States. At the 2020 Census, the population was 7,458. It served as the state capital of Illinois from 1819 until 1839, when the seat of state government moved to the current capital of Springfield. Vandalia was for years the western terminus of the National Road. From 1836 onward, Vandalia is the home of the Vandalia State House State Historic Site.

History

Vandalia was founded in 1819 as a new capital city for Illinois.  The previous capital, Kaskaskia, was unsuitable because it was under the constant threat of flooding.  The townsite, located in Bond County at the time, was hastily prepared for the 1820 meeting of the Illinois General Assembly.  In 1821, Fayette County was created, including Vandalia.

The history of the name Vandalia is uncertain. Different theories can be found in almost all of the books written about Vandalia over the years. In her book Vandalia: Wilderness Capital of Lincoln's Land, Mary Burtschi tells of a conversation between one of the original surveyors of the town and a Vandalia resident. The surveyor, Colonel Greenup, explained that Van was suggested by one of the men. He recommended this as an abbreviation to the word vanguard meaning the forefront of an advancing movement. Another suggestion was made for the term dalia, derived from the Anglo-Saxon word dale which means a valley between hills. Greenup takes credit in the conversation for connecting the two terms to form the name Vandalia.

Another possible source of the name is the Vandalia colony, a failed attempt to establish a fourteenth colony in part of what is now West Virginia and Kentucky. The Vandalia colony was named in honor of Queen Charlotte, who claimed descent from the Wendish tribe of Obodrites, also called the Vandals.

Another theory put forth is that Vandalia was named by those who located the state capital in the town; according to the story, they mistakenly thought the Vandals were a brave Native American tribe, rather than of Germanic origins.

The law under which Vandalia was founded included a provision that the capital would not be moved for twenty years. Even before the end of this period, the population center of the state had shifted far north of Vandalia. In 1837, the General Assembly voted to move the capital to Springfield.

On November 21, 1915, the Liberty Bell passed through Vandalia on its nationwide tour, while being returned to Philadelphia, Pennsylvania from the Panama-Pacific International Exposition in San Francisco.

In the early 1960s the sociologist Joseph Lyford examined the social structure of Vandalia in a book-length study that revealed the essentially corporatist nature of decision-making in the city; this work was recently revisited by the Economist newspaper.

Population trends
In 1900, 2,665 people lived in Vandalia; in 1910, 2,974; and in 1940, 5,288. The population was 6,975 at the 2000 census.

Education
The city has a Board of Education.  Among the public schools in the city are Jefferson Elementary School and former Central School, which was condemned in 1980.  The city's first high school was established in 1858.  Vandalia is home to the Okaw Valley Area Vocational Center, which trains high school students in vocational trades. It also serves vocational students from nearby high schools such as those in Greenville and Mulberry Grove.  The building trades class at the center each year purchases property in Vandalia, builds a house, and sells the improved property. They have sold 33 homes constructed by students.

Geography

Vandalia is situated on Interstate 70, U.S. Route 40 (the National Road) and U.S. Route 51.

Climate

Demographics

As of the census of 2000, there were 6,975 people, 2,344 households, and 1,425 families residing in the city. The racial makeup of the city was 95.57% White, 2.01% African American, 0.13% Native American, 0.30% Asian, 0.50% from other races, and 0.49% from two or more races. Hispanic or Latino of any race were 0.71% of the population.

There were 2,344 households, out of which 28.6% had children under the age of 18 living with them, 45.3% were married couples living together, 11.2% had a female householder with no husband present, and 39.2% were non-families. 35.1% of all households were made up of individuals, and 17.2% had someone living alone who was 65 years of age or older. The average household size was 2.25 and the average family size was 2.90.

In the city, the population was spread out, with 18.3% under the age of 18, 12.4% from 18 to 24, 34.3% from 25 to 44, 17.9% from 45 to 64, and 17.1% who were 65 years of age or older. The median age was 36 years. For every 100 females, there were 134.4 males. For every 100 females age 18 and over, there were 144.4 males.

The median income for a household in the city was $30,857, and the median income for a family was $39,762. Males had a median income of $27,342 versus $19,109 for females. The per capita income for the city was $14,918. About 8.9% of families and 15.6% of the population were below the poverty line, including 21.4% of those under age 18 and 13.8% of those age 65 or over.

Government
Vandalia is governed using the mayor council system. The council consists of eight members elected from one of four wards with each ward electing two members. The mayor along with the city clerk and treasurer are elected in a citywide vote.

Notable people
 Alfred Elisha Ames, politician and physician
 Josie Barnes, professional bowler and winner of the 2021 U.S. Women's Open
 Henry P. H. Bromwell, U.S. Representative from Illinois 
 John J. Bullington, Illinois politician
 Levi Davis, Illinois Auditor and lawyer
 H. Joel Deckard, U.S. Representative from Indiana
 William Lee D. Ewing, U.S. Senator and fifth Governor of Illinois
 William M. Farmer, Chief Justice of the Illinois Supreme Court
 Ferris Foreman, politician and Army colonel
 John W. Heavey, U.S. Army brigadier general, chief of the National Guard Bureau
 Miles E. Mills, Illinois politician and educator
 Frederick Remann, Illinois politician
 June Squibb, Academy Award-nominated actress
 Levi Stewart, Mormon pioneer

In fiction and popular culture
The case of Frier v. City of Vandalia was a case decided by the Seventh Circuit Court of Appeals on the issue of res judicata. The case originally involved a parking dispute in Vandalia but became a pivotal case in civil procedure.
Four US Navy ships have been named for Vandalia.

References

External links
 City of Vandalia

Cities in Illinois
Cities in Fayette County, Illinois
Illinois
County seats in Illinois
Populated places established in 1819
1819 establishments in Illinois